Carson R. Vitale (born August 25, 1988) is a Canadian professional baseball coach. He is the Major League Field Coordinator for the Seattle Mariners of Major League Baseball (MLB).

Career
Vitale attended Lambrick Park Secondary School in Victoria, British Columbia. Viatale attended Laredo College for his freshman year of college, and transferred to McLennan Community College for his sophomore year. Vitale transferred to Creighton University for his final two years of college. 

Vitale was drafted by the Texas Rangers in the 38th round of the 2010 MLB draft. He played for the AZL Rangers and Spokane Indians in 2010, and for Spokane in 2011. Vitale joined the Los Angeles Angels organization as a coach in 2012. He served as the hitting coach for the AZL Angels in 2012, and as hitting coach for the Orem Owls in 2013. He spent the 2014 and 2015 seasons as the manager of the DSL Angels. He joined the Los Angeles Dodgers organization and served as their International Field Coordinator in 2016 and 2017. He then joined the Seattle Mariners organization and served as their minor league field coordinator in 2018 and 2019.

On November 7, 2019, Vitale was named the Major League field coordinator for the Seattle Mariners.

References

External links

Creighton Bluejays bio

1988 births
Living people
Sportspeople from Victoria, British Columbia
Baseball people from British Columbia
Canadian expatriate baseball players in the United States
Canadian baseball coaches
Seattle Mariners coaches
McLennan Highlanders baseball players
Creighton Bluejays baseball players
Creighton University alumni
Arizona League Rangers players
Spokane Indians players
Minor league baseball coaches
Minor league baseball managers